The 2006 Sutton Council election took place on 4 May 2006 to elect members of Sutton London Borough Council in London, England. The whole council was up for election and the Liberal Democrats maintained control of the council, despite losing 11 seats to the Conservatives.

Election result

Ward results

Beddington North

Beddington South

Belmont

Carshalton Central

Carshalton South and Clockhouse

Cheam

Nonsuch

St Helier

Stonecot

Sutton Central

Sutton North

Sutton South

Sutton West

Wallington North

Wallington South

Wandle Valley

Worcester Park

The Wrythe

References

2006
2006 London Borough council elections